Sanjak of Segedin or Sanjak of Szeged (Turkish: Segedin Sancağı, Hungarian: Szegedi szandzsák, Serbian: Сегедински санџак) was an administrative territorial entity of the Ottoman Empire formed in the 16th century. It was located in the Bačka (Bácska) region. Initially, it was part of the Budin Province, but in the 17th century it was included into Eğri Province. Administrative center of the Sanjak of Segedin was Segedin. It was captured by Austria between 1686-1688 and was left to Austria according to Treaty of Carlowitz in 1699.

Administrative divisions

Sanjak of Segedin was divided into several kazas: 
Segedin (Szeged)
Sobotka (Subotica)
Baya (Baja)
Sonbor (Sombor)
Baç (Bač)
Titel

Beys (governors) of the sanjak
 Hasan Pasha Predojević (1592)

See also
Subdivisions of the Ottoman Empire
Bačka

References
Dr. Dušan J. Popović, Srbi u Vojvodini, knjiga 1, Novi Sad, 1990.
Istorijski atlas, Geokarta, Beograd, 1999.

External links
U SUBOTICI ODRŽANA PROMOCIJA PUBLIKACIJE O SEGEDINSKOM SANDŽAKU 1570. GODINE - Kako se živelo pod Turcima
Map - location of Sanjak of Segedin
Map of the Sanjak of Segedin

Ottoman period in Hungary
Sanjaks of the Ottoman Empire in Europe
History of Bačka
Ottoman history of Vojvodina
States and territories established in the 16th century
Ottoman Serbia
16th-century establishments in the Ottoman Empire
1699 disestablishments in the Ottoman Empire